Khartoum is the fourth and final album released in 2005 by Jandek. The album was released by Corwood Industries and his 43rd release overall. The album features the Corwood Representative on solo vocals and acoustic guitar.

Track listing

See also
 Corwood Industries discography

References

External links 
  Corwood Industries homepage

2005 albums
Jandek albums
Corwood Industries albums